Alliance Marc and Eva Stern Math and Science School, also known as The Stern Math and Science School or Stern MASS, is a charter high school in the University Hills neighborhood in the City of Los Angeles. It is a collaboration between the Alliance for College-Ready Public Schools and California State University, Los Angeles (Cal State L.A). The charter was granted by the Los Angeles Unified School District in 2006.

History
Stern MASS is one of many schools managed by the Alliance for College-Ready Public Schools. The school broke ground on September 10, 2007 on the California State University, Los Angeles (Cal State L.A.) Campus, moving into the building on November 3, 2008.  The school is named for Marc Stern, the Chairman of the TCW Group, and his wife, Eva.

Stern MASS began in 2006 in small bungalows on Whittier Bl and Atlantic Bl, then in 2007 it moved to Cal State LA Lot 7. It was there until 2008 when the school moved to their permanent facility on November 3, 2008 located next to Parking Lot 2 on the campus of Cal State LA.

The music program at the school won the 2013 SupportMusic Merit Award.

Student Uniform
● Grade 9 = White
● Grade 10 = Sports Gray
● Grade 11 = Navy Blue
● Grade 12 = Charcoal Gray

US News Rankings

US News 2022 Rankings 

 17 in Los Angeles metropolitan area High Schools
 45 in California High Schools
 93 in Charter High Schools
 369 in National Rankings

US News 2021 Rankings
22 in Los Angeles metropolitan area High Schools
54 in California High Schools
91 in Charter High Schools
397 in National Rankings

US News 2020 Rankings
5 in Los Angeles Unified School District High Schools
16 in Los Angeles metropolitan area High Schools
43 in California High Schools
84 in Charter High Schools
361 in National Rankings

US News 2019 Rankings
28 in Los Angeles metropolitan area High Schools
78 in California High Schools
114 in Charter High Schools
556 in National Rankings

Student Enrollment
Stern MASS serves around 584 students in grades nine through twelve, with a student-teacher ratio of 19:1. Full-time teachers 31.

Academic Performance Index (API)
API for High Schools in the East Los Angeles region.

References

External links

Marc & Eva Stern Math and Science School Official Website
Alliance for College-Ready Public Schools Official Website

Educational institutions established in 2006
California State University, Los Angeles
Charter high schools in California
High schools in Los Angeles
Alliance College-Ready Public Schools
2006 establishments in California